Black Swan Records was an American jazz and blues record label founded in 1921 in Harlem, New York. It was the first widely distributed label to be owned, operated, and marketed to African Americans. (Broome Special Phonograph Records was the first to be owned and operated by African Americans). Black Swan was established to give African Americans a label that would give them more creative liberties. Black Swan was revived in the 1990s for CD reissues of historic jazz and blues recordings.

History
Black Swan's parent company, Pace Phonograph Corporation, was founded in March 1921 by Harry Pace and was based in Harlem. The new production company was formed after Pace's music publishing partnership with W. C. Handy, Pace & Handy, had dissolved.  Black Swan, which sought to specialize in classical recordings, served as an investment opportunity for the Talented Tenth. As recognized by Thomas Brothers, "luminaries like Jack Nail and James Weldon Johnson served on the Black Swan board of directors", and The Crisis, the journal then edited by W.E.B. Du Bois, and published by the NAACP, invested its profits in the company.

Bert Williams was an early investor in Pace Phonograph. Williams also promised to record for the company once his exclusive contract with Columbia Records ended, but he died before that could occur.

Pace Phonograph Corporation was renamed Black Swan Phonograph Company in the fall of 1922. Both the record label and production company were named after 19th century opera star Elizabeth Greenfield, who was known as the Black Swan.

Former employees of Pace & Handy staffed the new company: Fletcher Henderson, who functioned as the recording manager, provided piano accompaniment for singers and led a small band for recording sessions. William Grant Still was named arranger and later musical director. Ads for Black Swan often ran in The Crisis.

Black Swan proved moderately successful. It recorded African American musicians, but as the label grew in popularity, Pace believed competing white-owned labels such as Columbia Records sought to "obstruct the progress and curtail the popularity of Black Swan Records". Although advertising for Black Swan Records claimed all its musicians and employees were African American, it sometimes used white musicians to back some of its singers.

The production company declared bankruptcy in December 1923, and in March 1924 Paramount Records bought the Black Swan label. The Chicago Defender reported the event by detailing important accomplishments of Black Swan in a short career span, including: pointed out—to the major, all white-owned, record companies—the significant market demand for black artists; prompted several major companies to begin publishing music by these performers. In addition, the Defender credited Pace with showing the majors how to target black audiences and to advertise in black newspapers. Paramount discontinued the Black Swan label a short time later.

The Black Swan label was revived in the 1990s for a series of CD reissues of historic jazz and blues recordings originally issued on Black Swan and Paramount. These CDs were issued by George H. Buck Jr's Jazzology and GHB labels under the control of the George H. Buck Jr. Jazz Foundation, which gained rights to the Paramount back-catalogue but not the Paramount name. Rights to the name "Black Swan Records" were also transferred to GHB.

Artists
 Bessie Allison, original member of the Shuffle Along cast
 C. Carroll Clark, baritone who was the first artist recorded by the label
 Four Harmony Kings, vocal quartet
 Henry Creamer and J. Turner Layton, vaudeville duo
 Katie Crippen, vaudeville singer
 Kemper Harreld, violinist
 Lucille Hegamin, jazz and blues singer
 Revella Hughes, soprano featured on one of the label's first releases
 Alberta Hunter, blues singer
 Nettie Moore was a singer who recorded "Deep River" (1922) /"Song of India" (1922) and "Christmas Chimes" with Ethel Waters on Black Swan.
Hattie King Reavis, soprano singer
 Trixie Smith, blues singer, second only to Ethel Waters in Black Swan sales.
 Florence Cole Talbert, first classical artist to record with Black Swan, soprano, music educator 
 "Mamie Jones", pseudonym for singer Aileen Stanley who was one of many white artists to record for Black Swan. These artists were "passing for colored" since the label was advertised as featuring only black artists.
 Eva Taylor, blues singer
 Ethel Waters, jazz, gospel, blues singer. She had the label's first commercially successful records, and remained their best seller.
 Essie Whitman, vaudeville singer

See also 
 List of record labels

Bibliography

Notes

References

 

                                    

  ; ; .

 
<li> 
<li> 
 

  ; ; .

 

 

  ;  (Vol. 2); .
 
 

  ; ; .
  ; .
  ; .

  ; ; .

 

  ; .

 

 

American record labels
Blues record labels
Jazz record labels
Record labels established in 1921
Record labels disestablished in 1924
Re-established companies
Black-owned companies of the United States